Temperature change due to climate change in Antarctica is not stable over the whole continent. West Antarctica is warming rapidly, while the inland regions are cooled by the winds in Antarctica. Water in the West Antarctic has warmed by 1 °C since year 1955. Further increase in temperature in water and on land will affect the climate, ice mass and life on the continent and have global implications. Present-day greenhouse gas concentrations are higher than ever according to ice cores from Antarctica, which indicates that warming on this continent is not part of a natural cycle and attributable to anthropogenic climate change.

Antarctica has lost 2720 ± 1390 gigatons of ice during the period from 1992 to 2017, and extrapolated predictions are that in year 2100 the sea level will rise by 25 cm just from the water bound in ice in Antarctica. The melting of the Antarctic ice sheet, particularly the West Antarctic, will shift ocean currents and have a global impact. Climate change affects the biodiversity on the continent, although the extent of this is uncertain as many species in Antarctica remain undiscovered. There are documented changes to flora and fauna on the continent already. Changes include increase in population size in plants, and adaptation to new habitat by penguins. Increase in temperature lead to melting of permafrost, which contributes to release of greenhouse gases and chemicals that trapped in the ice.

Even with goals and limitations made by the Paris Agreement it might be too late to reverse ice melting in West Antarctica, and future changes in climate in Antarctica will affect all parts of the globe.

Impacts on the physical environment

Temperature and weather changes 
Temperatures measured after year 1957 until the early 2000s show a difference in trend on the Antarctic Peninsula and the continental interior. According to a study in 2009, West Antarctica increased in temperature by 0.176 ± 0.06 °C per decade between year 1957 and 2006. Another study in year 2020 show a cooling of the air temperature by 0.7 °C per decade from year 1986 to 2006 at Lake Hoare station. Both studies indicate that change in temperature may alter the wind pattern, and according to another study in year 2020 the westerlies winds around the South Pole have got more intense in the last half of the twentieth century. Same study indicates that the Antarctic Peninsula was the fastest-warming place on Earth, closely followed by West Antarctica, but these trends weakened in the early 21st-century. Conversely, the South Pole in East Antarctica barely warmed last century, but in the last three decades the temperature increase there has been more than three times greater than the global average, warming by 0.61 ± 0.34 °C per decade.  In February 2020, the continent recorded its highest temperature of 18.3 °C, which was a degree higher than the previous record of 17.5 °C in March 2015. Models predict that Antarctic temperatures will be up 4 °C, on average, by 2100 and this will be accompanied by a 30% increase in precipitation and a 30% decrease in total sea ice. A main component of climate variability in Antarctica is the Southern Annular Mode, which showed strengthened winds around Antarctica in summer of the later decades of the 20th century, associated with cooler temperatures over the continent. The trend was at a scale unprecedented over the last 600 years; the most dominant driver of this mode of variability is likely the depletion of ozone above the continent.

The temperature in the upper layer of the ocean in West Antarctica has warmed 1 °C since 1955. The Antarctic Circumpolar Current (ACC) is warming faster than the whole global ocean. Changes to this current will not only affect Antarctica's climate but also water flow in Atlantic, Pacific and Indian ocean.

There are natural fluctuations in climate, and by studying ice cores in Antarctica it is shown that these fluctuations are correlated to green house concentration in the atmosphere. The fluctuations are referred to glacial and interglacial periods. The concentration of carbon dioxide during glacial periods is 180 parts per million and methane 300 parts per million. During the interglacial periods the concentration is 320 parts per million for carbon dioxide and 790 parts per billion for methane. Today the concentration is 417 parts per million for carbon dioxide (April 2022) and 1,896 parts per billion for methane (April 2022), showing that concentrations today are not within normal fluctuations.

Changes in ice mass 

A 2018 systematic review of all previous studies and data by the Ice Sheet Mass Balance Inter-comparison Exercise (IMBIE) found that Antarctica lost 2720 ± 1390 gigatons of ice during the period from 1992 to 2017 with an average rate of 109 ± 56 Gt per year, enough to contribute 7.6 millimeters to sea level rise once all detached icebergs melt. Most ice losses occurred in West Antarctica and the Antarctic Peninsula. The study estimates an increase in ice-sheet mass loss from 53 ± 29 Gt per year to 159 ± 26 Gt per year from 1992 to the final five years of the study in the West Antarctica. On the Antarctic Peninsula average loss of ice-sheet mass is estimated to −20 ± 15 Gt per year with an increase in loss of roughly 15 Gt per year after year 2000. In both regions the loss was affected by diminution in ice thickness and floating ice shelves. The results from East Antarctica show uncertainty but estimates an average in gain of 5 ± 46 Gt ice per year during the period of the study.

It is expected that Antarctic ice sheets will continue to melt and will have a profound effect on global climate. By the year 2100, 25 centimeters of water will have been added to the world's ocean, as water temperature continues to rise. Ice melt in the future will differ depending on average rise in global temperature caused by greenhouse gas emissions. Conclusion on Paris Climate Agreement policies is that if global warming is limited to no more than 2 °C increase, the loss of ice in Antarctica will continue at a current rate until the end of the century. Although, current policies allow warming of 3 °C leading to a fast acceleration in ice loss after 2060 contributing to a global mean sea level rise of 0.5 cm per year by 2100. Scenarios that include even higher emissions will have bigger devastating effects on global mean sea level rise.

The Antarctic ice sheet accounts for 90% of the world's ice volume and 70% of all freshwater on Earth. Global warming has resulted in rapid mass loss of the Antarctica ice sheet. A study published in 2022, revealed that glacier melting from the Antarctica ice sheet accounted for most of the total freshening occurring in the Southern Ocean. The freshening of the Southern Ocean results in increased stratification and stabilization of the ocean. This would weaken overturning circulation and prevent saltier deep water from rising to the surface waters.

Black carbon and effects on albedo 
Black carbon accumulated on snow and ice reduces the reflection of ice causing it to absorb more energy and accelerate melting. This can create an ice-albedo feedback loop where meltwater itself effects the acceleration of melting because of the affected surface reflection. In Antarctica black carbon has been found on Antarctic Peninsula and around Union Glacier with the highest concentrations near anthropic activities. The result of human activities in Antarctica will accelerate snowmelt on the continent, but the speed of melting will differ depending on how far black carbon and other emissions will spread, along with the size of the area that they will cover. A study from 2022 estimate that the seasonal melt during the summer period will start sooner on sites with black carbon because of the reduction in albedo reflection that ranges from 5 to 23 kg/m2.

Permafrost 
Increasing temperatures in Antarctica also leads to melting of permafrost which can release many chemicals. Similar to how soils have a variety of chemical contaminants and nutrients in them, the permafrost in Antarctica traps similar compounds until they melt and the contaminants are released again. These released chemicals change the water chemistry of surface waters, small organisms like micro-algae consume the contaminants, and then bioaccumulation and biomagnification occur throughout the food web. Persistent organic pollutants (POPs) and heavy metals can be found in the permafrost and the remobilization of these chemicals will likely have negative consequences on organisms which will then affect the whole ecosystem. Some of the concerning chemicals and observed biological effects are PAH's (carcinogenic, liver damage), PCB's/HCB/DDT (decreased reproductive success, immunohematological disorders), and Hg/Pb/Cd (endocrine disruption, DNA damage, immunotoxicity, reprotoxicity). Understanding what chemicals are trapped in the permafrost and their potential negative effects on Antarctic ecosystems is important because we know that many chemicals will be mobilized from the permafrost as we see increasing temperatures due to climate change.

Impacts on ecology

Biodiversity 
In 2010 according to the Register of Antarctic Marine Species, there were known to be 8,806 species that had been discovered up to that point and there could be as many as 17,000 species that live in the Antarctic which means that there are still thousands of species that have yet to be discovered and are apart of what makes this biodiverse environment. Many modern molecular techniques have found some species including bivalves, isopods, and pycnogonida in the Antarctic ecosystem. The issue with studies of some of these species is that 90% of the Antarctic region is greater than 1,000 meters deep, and only 30% of the benthic sample locations were found below this depth which indicates that there is a major bias toward testing shallower areas. Cruises such as ANDEEP (Antarctic, benthic deep-sea biodiversity project) has sampled around 11% of the deep sea and they found 585 species of isopod crustaceans that were previously un-described which shows that further research of this deep sea area could really intensify the known biodiversity of the Antarctic.

Another major source of biodiversity within ice communities throughout Antarctica are algal communities found located in brine channels. During the summer, the sea ice undergoes a lot of transformation when the ice begins to melt and sub-ice communities are formed. These sub-ice communities are often found in what are known as brine channels that occur when the ice slowly starts to melt and creates channels within the ice that allow for organisms such as carbon-binding algae. This is important because algae is at the base of the food-chain and with these algae, photosynthesis can occur which allows for a sustainable ecosystem and overall a more abundant food-chain.

Due to a lack of human population some scientists had assumptions that Antarctic biodiversity might be unaffected by the climate change. The average global temperature has risen by 1 degree celsius since 1880 and many studies have shown that there are adverse effects occurring in biodiverse ecosystems within Antarctica. The big question is how will biodiversity react to the climate shifting even a degree more? An experiment was done to quantify the changes that may occur to the Antarctic ecosystem due to climate change and scientists predicted that if the planet were to go beyond the global mean temperature, for example 3 degrees Celsius more, the local species richness would decline by nearly 17% and the suitable climate area by 50%.

Heatwave events in Antarctica are expected to increase in frequency and intensity which can result in the loss of individual species. The absence of predators in these ecosystems could trigger a trophic cascade that would lead to the extinction of secondary species. However, the presence of predators can help buffer the impacts of such warming events.

Plants 
The continental flora in Antarctica is dominated by lichens, followed by mosses and ice algae. The plants are mainly found in  coastal areas in Antarctica. The only vascular plants on continental Antarctica, Deschampsia antarctica and Colobanthus quitensis, are found on the Antarctic Peninsula. Because of changing climatic conditions, adaptation to the new conditions is necessary for the survival of the plants. One way to deal with  the problem is to perform fast growth when the conditions are favourable. High concentrations of carbon dioxide and other greenhouse gases in the atmosphere cause climate change with increase in temperature, which leads to (I) increase in water availability, which in turn leads to (II) increase in plant colonization and (III) local-scale population expansion, which leads to (IV) increase in biomass, trophic complexity, and increased terrestrial diversity, and (V) more complex ecosystem structure, and (VI) dominance of biotic factors that drive processes in the ecosystem. 

Increased photosynthesis because of elevated temperatures has been shown in two maritime vascular species (Deschampsia antarctica and Colobanthus quitensis). Because of increased temperature, the two vascular plants have increased in population size and in their expansion range. Climate change may also have significant effects on indirect processes, for example soil nutrient availability, plant nutrient uptake, and metabolism.

Increased photosynthesis has also been found in the three continental mosses Bryum argenteum, Bryum pseudotriquetrum, and Ceratodon purpureus. A drying trend is affecting terrestrial biota in East Antarctica. Drier microclimates have led to reduction in moss health. Because of acute stress, the moss colour has changed. Due to drought and other stressors, many green mosses have turned to red to brown coloration. This indicates a shift away from photosynthesis and growth towards investments in photoprotective pigments. If the environmental conditions improve, the mosses can recover. If photoprotective pigments decline relative to chlorophyll, the stressed mosses will be green again. New healthy moss plants can sprout through moribund turf. At the expense of the endemic species Schistidium antarctici, two desiccation tolerant moss species, Bryum pseudotriquetrum and Ceratodon purpureus, have increased.

Significant changes that affect the lichen biota take place on young moraines in the proximity of recently uncovered areas because of retreat of glaciers. The changes in diversity of lichens depend on the humidity of the substrate and on the duration of the snow cover. Habitats that reduce the frequency of occurrence are wet or moist stony soil, rock ledges, moist mosses, and meltwater runnels. Continuous deglaciation has resulted in increased colonization by pioneer lichen species. In the maritime cliff rocks and in the proximity of large penguin colonies, the smallest changes in the lichen biota have been observed.

Increase in UV-B radiation because of thinner ozone layer causes damage to cells and photosynthesis. Plants try to defend themselves against increase in ultraviolet radiation with the help of antioxidants. In UV-B exposed plants, the antioxidative enzymes superoxide dismutase, catalase, and peroxidase are synthesized. The exposed plants also synthesize the non-enzymatic antioxidants ascorbate, carotenoids, and flavonoids. All these antioxidants are also used by humans to protect themselves from the damaging effects by free radicals and reactive oxygen species. Uncertainty of the changing environmental conditions causes difficulties in adaptation and survival for species in Antarctica. Increase in temperature might lead to invasion of alien species and changes of the ecological communities in the Antarctic ecosystem. Increasing UV-B radiation already has a negative impact on Antarctic flora.

Animals 

The marine food web in Antarctica is characterized by few trophic components and low prey diversity. The predator-prey dynamics depend on fluctuations in the relative short food chains. A few key species dominate the marine ecosystems. Antarctic krill (Euphasia superba) and ice krill (Euphasia crystallorophias) are examples of key species. They feed on phytoplankton and are the main food for fish and penguins. Shifts in the periodicity of sea ice cycles because of climate change cause mismatches between earlier phytoplankton blooms, krill development, and availability for penguins. The consequences for many penguins are increase in foraging trips and reduced breeding success. Absence of krill leads to increased population fluctuations and diet switches for penguins.

As penguins are highest in the Antarctic food web, they will be severely affected by climate change, but they can respond by acclimation, adaptation, or by range shift. Range shift through dispersal leads to colonization elsewhere, but it leads local extinction. Microevolution is difficult to find for climate change because it is too slow. The most important responses to climate change in Antarctica are poleward shifts, expansion, and range contraction. Ice-obligate penguins are the most affected species, but the near threatened and ice-intolerant gentoo penguin (Pygoscelis papua) has been benefitted. In  maritime Antarctica the population of gentoo penguins is rapidly increasing. Due to regional climate changes, they have moved southwards. Now they colonise previously inaccessible territories. Gentoo penguins use mosses as nesting material. This nesting behaviour is new for southern penguin colonies in Antarctica. By dispersal and adaptive nesting behaviour, gentoo penguins have been remarkably successful in population growth. At the borders of the current geographic distributions, the most obvious responses to climate change occur. There the most likely response to climate change is range shift because adaptation and evolution in penguins are too slow.

In birds phenological responses are commonly observed, for example shifts in return to breeding places and timing of egg laying. For penguins shift in penguin phenology in response to prey phenology is important. Often common environmental drivers determine the predator-prey synchrony. Climate driven fluctuations that reduce krill availability also reduce the penguin breeding success. Although gentoo penguins share their prey resource with Adélie penguins (Pygoscelis adeliae) during the breeding season, there is no resource competition between the two species. This implies that current population trends in this region are governed by other factors than competition. The emperor penguin (Aptenodytes forsteri), which has a long breeding season, is constrained in space and time. In the future phenological changes in penguins are likely to be limited by their genotypes. Possible ecological traps might attract ice-intolerant species to ice-free areas without foraging grounds. In the future fitness will decrease if there are no favourable conditions for life cycle events and no adaptive response.

Non-native species 
Tourism in Antarctica has been significantly increasing for the past 2 decades with 74,401 tourists in the summer of 2019/2020. The increased human activity associated with tourism likely means there is increased opportunity for the introduction of non-native species. The potential for introduction of non-native species in an environment with rising temperatures and decreasing ice cover is especially concerning because there is an increased probability that introduced species will thrive. Climate change will likely reduce the survivability for native species, improving the chance that introduced species will thrive due to decreased competition. Policy limiting the number of tourists and the permitted activities on and around the continent which mitigate the introduction of new species and limit the disturbance to native species will help prevent the introduction and dominance by non-native species. The continued designation of protected areas like Antarctic Specially Protected Areas (ASMA) and Antarctic Specially Managed Areas (ASMA) would be one way to accomplish this.

Future impacts 
Even if global temperature rise is limited to the Paris Agreement's stated temperature goals of capping global mean temperature increases to 1.5–2 °C above pre-industrial levels, there is still concern that West Antarctic ice-sheet instability may be already irreversible. If a similar trajectory, still under the global temperature limit goals, persists, the East Antarctic Ice Sheet may also be at risk of permanent destabilization. It has been shown using physics-based computer modeling that even with a 2 °C reduction in global mean temperatures Antarctic ice loss could continue at the same rate as it did in the first two decades of the 21st century. Marine ice sheet instability (MISI) and marine ice cliff instability (MICI) contribute major uncertainty to the future Antarctic ice sheet mass losses. Marine parts of the ice sheet mediate glacial ice flow, and loss of marine parts of the ice sheet (like ice shelves), can the accelerate loss of grounded ice. The Sixth Assessment Report (AR6) of the Intergovernmental Panel on Climate Change (IPCC) explains that ice sheet model simulations that remove all Antarctic ice shelves (and prevent them from reforming) show 2 to 10 meters of sea level equivalent (SLE) mass loss after 500 years due to MISI. Models show the West Antarctic Ice Sheet contributing 2 to 5 meters to this sea level rise, with the majority of the mass loss occurring in the first one to two centuries.

The continued effects of climate change are likely to be felt by animal populations as well. Adélie penguins, a species of penguin found only along the coast of Antarctica, may see nearly one-third of their current population threatened by 2060 with unmitigated climate change. Emperor penguin populations may be at a similar risk, with 80% of populations being at risk of extinction by 2100 with no mitigation. With Paris Agreement temperature goals in place, however, that number may decline to 19% under the 2 °C goal or 31% under the 1.5 °C goal. Warming ocean temperatures have also reduced the amount of krill and copepods in the ocean surrounding Antarctica, which has led to the inability of baleen whales to recover from pre-whaling levels. Without a reversal in temperature increases, baleen whales are likely to be forced to adapt their migratory patterns or face local extinction.

Finally, the development of Antarctica for the purposes of industry, tourism, or an increase in research facilities may put direct pressure on the continent and threaten its status as largely untouched land.

Mitigation and adaptation 
Climate change is a global issue. Thus, the rising temperatures and associated ice and permafrost melting seen in Antarctica will only be mitigated through global action to reduce greenhouse gas emissions. For this reason, policy efforts with regards to Antarctica have focused on adapting to climate change rather than mitigating climate change itself.

One realistic way that policy can be used to address climate change effects in Antarctica is by aiming to increase climate change resilience through the protection of ecosystems. Antarctic Specially Protected Areas (ASPA) and Antarctic Specially Managed Areas (ASMA) are areas of Antarctica that are designated by the Antarctic Treaty for special protection of the flora and fauna. Both ASPAs and ASMAs restrict entry but to different extents, with ASPAs being the highest level of protection. Designation of ASPAs has decreased 84% since the 1980s despite a rapid increase in tourism which may pose additional stress on the natural environment and ecosystems. In order to alleviate the stress on Antarctic ecosystems posed by climate change and furthered by the rapid increase in tourism, much of the scientific community advocates for an increase in protected areas like ASPAs to improve Antarctica's resilience to rising temperatures.

See also 

 Antarctic sea ice
 Antarctica cooling controversy

References

Sources

External links
 White Ocean of Ice Antarctica and climate change blog
  published on April 10, 2019 PBS NewsHour

Antarctica
Climate of Antarctica
Effects of climate change